George Shannon Long (September 11, 1883 – March 22, 1958) was a member of the United States House of Representatives from Louisiana. He was also a member of the Long family.

Long was born in Tunica, Louisiana, on September 11, 1883. He was the second son of Huey Pierce Long (1852–1937) and Caledonia Palestine Tison (1860–1913). After dental school, he moved to Tulsa, Oklahoma and served in the state house during the 9th Oklahoma Legislature.

See also
 List of United States Congress members who died in office (1950–1999)

References

External links
William J. "Bill" Dodd, Peapatch Politics: The Earl Long Era in Louisiana Politics, Baton Rouge: Claitor's Publishing, 1991.
http://politicalgraveyard.com/bio/long.html#R9M0J4HHQ
Glenn R. Conrad, "George S. Long," A Dictionary of Louisiana Biography, 1988, p. 518.

1883 births
1958 deaths
People from West Feliciana Parish, Louisiana
Politicians from Alexandria, Louisiana
People from Pineville, Louisiana
People from Winnfield, Louisiana
20th-century American lawyers
American dentists
20th-century American educators
Baptists from Louisiana
George S.
Huey Long
Oklahoma Democrats
United States Army personnel of World War I
Democratic Party members of the United States House of Representatives from Louisiana
Burials in Louisiana
Educators from Louisiana
20th-century dentists